Once More About Love is a 1968 Soviet drama film directed by Georgy Natanson.

Plot 
The film tells about the spoiled attention and arrogant scientist who meets a young woman, interested in him with her extraordinary and unpredictability. Can they get along with each other?

Cast 
 Tatyana Doronina as Natasha Aleksandrova
 Alexander Lazarev as Elektron Yevdokimov
 Oleg Yefremov as Lev Kartsev
 Yelena Korolyova as Ira
 Aleksandr Shirvindt as Feliks  Toptygin 
 Vladimir Komratov as Vladik
 Sergey Chistyakov as Yevgeny Dal  
 Yevgeny Karelskikh as restaurant host
 Nikolay Merzlikin as young man at night stop
 Zhanna Vladimirskaya as Maya
 Zinovy Vysokovsky as Pyotr Galperin

Reaction
Natanson's film takes 135th place in the list of the highest grossing Soviet films with 36.7 million viewers.

Critical response  
Film critic Vsevolod Revich noted in his review:
This is a film about people who can and are able to deeply and strongly experience, and therefore, about happy people: despite the fact that there are tears, an unrequited feeling, and tragedy in it.

References

External links 
 

1968 films
1960s Russian-language films
Soviet drama films
Soviet black-and-white films
Soviet romantic drama films
Mosfilm films
Films about scientists
1968 romantic drama films
Soviet films based on plays
Films set in the Soviet Union
Films shot in Moscow
Films about flight attendants